Richard Gach (31 October 1930 - 25 December 1991), born in Itzling (then the municipality Gnigl-Itzling, today district of Salzburg), died in Horn, was an Austrian architect, sketch artist, and watercolorist. He mainly designed schools for the city of Vienna and was involved in the construction of some residential buildings.

Biography

Private 
The Gach-Gräff family included several artists. Richard Gach married Johanna Henke, daughter of the chemist Richard Henke. One of their daughters, Martina Maria Gach, a professor for art, married the artist Helmuth Gräff, and was the mother of the artist Matthias Laurenz Gräff. Gach was a member of the Schlaraffia society under the religious name "Knight of Kamp".

Professional 

Richard Gach completed the Salzburg HTL for Building Construction and in 1949 he studied architecture at the Academy of Fine Arts Vienna in the class of Lois Welzenbacher. As a student he built the scale model for the construction of the Wiener Stadthalle at the request of the architect Roland Rainer. During his studies he became friends with architects such as Gustav Peichl, Friedrich Achleitner, Wilhelm Holzbauer, and Hans Puchhammer. He graduated in 1955 with a Mag. Arch. and began work in the architecture office of Wilhelm Hubatsch, with whom he later won several architectural competitions.

After becoming an independent architect in 1958, Gach actively contributed to the construction of Viennese housing and schools. The Gach-designed Gangschule with 24 classes and two high schools comes from the "haze circle" of Hubatsch's school concepts. This concept is typified by the residential complex Edergasse 1-3 in Vienna 21 and the two high schools Hernalser Gymnasium Geblergasse and Amerling-Gymnasium. In 1970, the former Esterhazypalais (Palais Kaunitz)  was demolished for the construction of the Amerling Gymnasium. Built in 1970-1972, the new building with 24 classrooms and two sports halls corresponds to the common typology used in the construction of secondary schools in the late sixties, without any architectural respect for the environment.

It was also important to him to build contemporary architecture, also in the context of church building. He planned the church building of Rigau at Abtenau (Salzburg) with Robert Posch in 1956. The project failed because of the Pinzgau district authority. The Wiener Wochenpresse headline said that the planning ended up being "customary" (i.e. traditional).

Richard Gach was also active in Lower Austria, as reflected in numerous construction projects such as the Aufbahrungshalle in Orth an der Donau, the Bundesgymnasium and Bundesrealgymnasium Amstetten (high school), the Sparkasse Mistelbach and the Hauptschule Gars am Kamp. Gach lived in his adopted home Gars am Kamp until his death. In 2011, a portion of his artistic estate, consisting of architectural drawings and watercolors, was auctioned there.

Construction contracts (selection) 

 1958: Housing estate Nußberggasse 9 / Bockkellergasse, Vienna 19 (with Wilhelm Hubatsch)
 1960: Bundesgymnasium and Bundesrealgymnasium Amstetten (highschool) (with Wilhelm Hubatsch, Competition 1st Prize
 1962-1964: Residential building Edergasse 1-3, Vienna 21
 1963: Josefstädter Straße 93-97, Vienna 8 (with Ernst Schuster)
 1964: elementary school Pfeilgasse and new middle school Pfeilgasse. Pfeilgasse 42b / Stolzenthalergasse 19, Vienna 8 (with Ernst Schuster)
 
 1964-1966: Sparkasse Mistelbach
 1964-1968: Hauptschule Gars am Kamp
 1968: Hernalser Gymnasium Geblergasse (highschool), Vienna 17
 1960 / 70s: Aufbahrungshalle in Orth on the Danube
 1970-1972: Amerling-Gymnasium (highschool), Vienna 6
 1973-1977: Residence Leopold-Figl-Gasse 503/504 and 523/524, Gars am Kamp

Non-realistic objects (selection) 
 1956: Church building of Rigau near Abtenau (Pongau) (with Robert Posch)
 1956: Bundesrealgymnasium Horn (highschool) (with Wilhelm Hubatsch, competition, 2nd prize
 1957: Administration Building Austrian Drau Power Plants, Klagenfurt (with Wilhelm Hubatsch, Competition, 1st Prize)
 1958: Town Planning Competition, Vienna 10, Eisenstadtplatz (with Wilhelm Hubatsch, Competition, 2nd Prize)

References 

1930 births
1991 deaths
20th-century Austrian architects
20th-century Austrian artists
Artists from Salzburg
People from Lower Austria
Academy of Fine Arts Vienna alumni